Katherine A. Heinrich (born February 21, 1954) is a mathematician and mathematics educator who became the first female president of the Canadian Mathematical Society. Her research interests include graph theory and the theory of combinatorial designs. Originally from Australia, she moved to Canada where she worked as a professor at Simon Fraser University and as an academic administrator at the University of Regina.

Education and career
Heinrich was born in Murwillumbah, New South Wales.
As an undergraduate at the University of Newcastle in Australia, Heinrich graduated as a University Medalist in 1976.
She continued at Newcastle as a graduate student, and completed her doctorate there in 1979.
Her dissertation, Some problems on combinatorial arrays, was supervised by Walter D. Wallis.

Heinrich joined the mathematics faculty at Simon Fraser University in 1981, and married another graph theorist at Simon Fraser, Brian Alspach. She became a full professor in 1987, and chaired the department from 1991 to 1996.
While working at Simon Fraser, Heinrich coordinated several outreach activities including a conference for pre-teen girls called "Women Do Math" and later "Discover the Possibilities", a shopping-center exhibit called "Math in the Malls", and a series of national conferences on mathematics education.

From 1996 to 1998, she served as president of the Canadian Mathematical Society, its first female president. In 1999, she moved to the University of Regina as academic vice president, and in 2003 she was confirmed for a second five-year term as vice president. At Regina, she helped establish an institute for French-language education, and built stronger connections between Regina and the First Nations University of Canada.

She retired in 2007 and returned to Newcastle, New South Wales, where she is active in textile arts.

Research
MathSciNet lists 73 publications for Heinrich, dated from 1976 to 2012. Several of Heinrich's research publications concern orthogonal Latin squares, analogous concepts in graph theory, and applications of these concepts in parallel computing. As well, she has published works on finding spanning subgraphs with constraints on the degree of each vertex, and on Alspach's conjecture on disjoint cycle covers of complete graphs, among other topics.

Selected publications

Recognition
The University of Newcastle gave Heinrich a Gold Medal for Professional Excellence in 1995. In 2005, she won the Adrien Pouliot Award of the Canadian Mathematical Society for her work in mathematics education.

References

1954 births
Living people
Australian mathematicians
Australian women mathematicians
Canadian mathematicians
Graph theorists
Mathematics educators
University of Newcastle (Australia) alumni
Academic staff of Simon Fraser University
Academic staff of the University of Regina
Presidents of the Canadian Mathematical Society